Giuseppe Mazza may refer to:
Giuseppe Mazza (painter) (1817–1884), Italian painter in the Romantic style
Giuseppe Maria Mazza (1653–1741), sculptor of Bologna, Italy